Marguerite Deval (19 September 1866 – 18 December 1955) was a French singer and actress.

Born Marguerite Hippolyte Juliette Brulfer, she was a comedian, opera chanteuse, and actress of stage and film. She was born in Strasbourg and died in Paris.

In 1931 she took the role of Lady Eversharp at the premiere of Reynaldo Hahn's operetta, Brummell.

See also
Yvette Guilbert

Selected filmography
 The Mad Night (1932)
 The Man of the Hour (1937)
 Lady Killer (1937)
 Street Without Joy (1938)
 Women's Prison (1938)
 Nine Bachelors (1939)
 President Haudecoeur (1940)
 Bécassine (1940)
 Marie-Martine (1943)
 Mademoiselle Béatrice (1943)
 Traveling Light (1944)
 Gringalet (1946)
 As Long as I Live (1946)
 Eve and the Serpent (1949)
 The Ferret (1950)
 Paris Still Sings (1951)

References

External links

portrait c.1904

1866 births
1955 deaths
Burials at Batignolles Cemetery
French stage actresses
French film actresses
French silent film actresses
Actors from Strasbourg
19th-century French actresses
20th-century French actresses
Musicians from Strasbourg